Karim Boukraa (born 7 March 1973) is a French professional footballer who plays as a striker.

Scotland

Flying to Scotland on 3 August 2000 to discuss a deal with Greenock Morton, Boukraa exited the Ton four months later to Ross County, citing unhappiness with Morton's directors. Assisting to beat Ayr United 2-0 on debut, he was best known for his skillful performance during the 2000-01 Scottish Cup 4th Round between the Staggies and Scottish Premier League giants Rangers, despite losing 3-2. Earlier, the wideman said he would not be vigilant of their best players as he had previous French Cup experience with top clubs. Staying on for the 2001/02 season, County advance to the 2001–02 Scottish League Cup quarter-finals with a goal to knock out Dundee 2-1, but was eventually axed with three others.

Thinking back to his years in Scotland, the Frenchman stated that "There,  everything is done to put the footballer in the best possible environment".

References

External links 
 at Footballdatabase.eu 
 Soccerbase Profile 
 The Staggie Archive Profile

Living people
Angoulême Charente FC players
Rodez AF players
Ross County F.C. players
Ligue 1 players
French footballers
French expatriate footballers
Paris FC players
USF Fécamp players
Le Havre AC players
Association football forwards
1973 births
Expatriate footballers in Scotland
French expatriate sportspeople in Scotland
Stade Brestois 29 players
Greenock Morton F.C. players
Gazélec Ajaccio players